The Chinese Ambassador to Trinidad and Tobago is the official representative of the People's Republic of China to the Republic of Trinidad and Tobago.

List of representatives

See also
Ambassadors of China
China–Trinidad and Tobago relations

References

External links
Official website - of the Chinese Embassy in Trinidad and Tobago (English)
Official website - of the Chinese High Commission in Trinidad and Tobago (Chinese)

China–Trinidad and Tobago relations
Trin
China